Batticaloa Lighthouse is a lighthouse in Sri Lanka, situated near the estuary in Palameenmadu. It was built in 1913 and is 28 meters high.

Location
Batticaloa's lighthouse is around 5 km from Batticaloa city, on Bar Road. You can access to it by taking Lake Road (also called Munich Vittoria Friendship Road) near Kallady Bridge and proceeding along Sinna Uppodai Lagoon for around 4 km. It is a very nice area for cycling or walking.

Gallery

See also

List of lighthouses in Sri Lanka

References

External links
 Sri Lanka Ports Authority 

Lighthouses completed in 1913
Lighthouse
Lighthouses in Sri Lanka
Tourist attractions in Eastern Province, Sri Lanka
1913 establishments in Ceylon